Lattice diffusion (also called bulk or volume diffusion) refers to atomic diffusion within a crystalline lattice.  Diffusion within the crystal lattice occurs by either interstitial or substitutional mechanisms and is referred to as lattice diffusion. In interstitial lattice diffusion, a diffusant (such as C in an iron alloy), will diffuse in between the lattice structure of another crystalline element. In substitutional lattice diffusion (self-diffusion for example), the atom can only move by substituting place with another atom. Substitutional lattice diffusion is often contingent upon the availability of point vacancies throughout the crystal lattice. Diffusing particles migrate from point vacancy to point vacancy by the rapid, essentially random jumping about (jump diffusion).  Since the prevalence of point vacancies increases in accordance with the Arrhenius equation, the rate of crystal solid state diffusion increases with temperature.  For a single atom in a defect-free crystal, the movement can be described by the "random walk" model.

Diffusion Coefficient for Interstitial Diffusion 
An atom diffuses in the interstitial mechanism by passing from one interstitial site to one of its nearest neighboring interstitial sites. The movement of atoms can be described as jumps, and the interstitial diffusion coefficient depends on the jump frequency. The jump frequency, is given by:

where

  is the number of nearest neighboring interstitial sites.
  is vibration frequency of the interstitial atom due to thermal energy.
  is the activation energy for the migration of the interstitial atom between sites.

 can be expressed as the sum of activation enthalpy term  and the activation entropy term , which gives the diffusion coefficient as:

where

  is the jump distance.

The diffusion coefficient can be simplified to an Arrhenius equation form:

where

  is a temperature-independent material constant. 
  is the activation enthalpy. 

In the case of interstitial diffusion, the activation enthalpy  is only dependent on the activation energy barrier to the movement of interstitial atoms from one site to another. The diffusion coefficient increases exponentially with temperature at a rate determined by the activation enthalpy .

Diffusion Coefficient for Substitution Diffusion

Self-Diffusion 
The rate of self-diffusion can be measured experimentally by introducing radioactive A atoms (A*) into pure A and measuring the rate at which penetration occurs at various temperatures. A* and A atoms have approximately identical jump frequencies since they are chemically identical. The diffusion coefficient of A* and A can be related to the jump frequency and expressed as:

where

  is the diffusion coefficient of radioactive A atoms in pure A.
  is the diffusion coefficient of A atoms in pure A.
  is the jump frequency for both the A* and A atoms.
  is the jump distance.

An atom can make a successful jump when there are vacancies nearby and when it has enough thermal energy to overcome the energy barrier to migration. The number of successful jumps an atom will make in one second, or the jump frequency, can be expressed as:

where

  is the number of nearest neighbors.
  is the frequency of temperature-independent atomic vibration.
  is the vacancy fraction of the lattice.
  is the activation energy barrier to atomic migration.

In thermodynamic equilibrium, 

where  is the free energy of vacancy formation for a single vacancy.

Substituting ΔG = ΔH – TΔS gives:

The diffusion coefficient can be simplified to an Arrhenius equation form:

where

  is approximately a constant. 
  is the activation enthalpy. 

Compared to that of interstitial diffusion, the activation energy for self-diffusion has an extra term (ΔHv). Since self-diffusion requires the presence of vacancies whose concentration depends on ΔHv.

Vacancy Diffusion 
Diffusion of a vacancy can be viewed as the jumping of a vacancy onto an atom site. It is the same process as the jumping of an atom into a vacant site but without the need to consider the probability of vacancy presence, since a vacancy is usually always surrounded by atom sites to which it can jump. A vacancy can have its own diffusion coefficient that is expressed as: 

where  is the jump frequency of a vacancy. 

The diffusion coefficient can also be expressed in terms of enthalpy of migration and entropy of migration of a vacancy, which are the same as for the migration of a substitutional atom: 

Comparing the diffusion coefficient between self-diffusion and vacancy diffusion gives: 

where the equilibrium vacancy fraction

Diffusion in a Binary System 
In a system with multiple components (e.g. a binary alloy), the solvent (A) and the solute atoms (B) will not move in an equal rate. The interdiffusion coefficient  is defined by the Darken's equation as:

See also 
 Kirkendall effect
 Phase transformations in solids
 Mass diffusivity

References

External links 
 Classical and nanoscale diffusion (with figures and animations)

Diffusion